Arthur Marvin "Tonto" Coleman (July 7, 1907 – October 18, 1973) was an American football coach and college athletics administrator.  He served as the head football coach at  Abilene Christian University from 1942 to 1949, compiling a record of 28–15–2.  After working as an assistant football coach at the University of Florida and the Georgia Institute of Technology, Coleman was appointed the commission of the Southeastern Conference (SEC) in 1966, a position he filled until 1972.

Early life and education
Coleman was born in Phil Campbell, Alabama, but moved to Texas with his family when he was 12 years old. After graduating from high school, he attended Abilene Christian University in Abilene, Texas, where he was a varsity letterman in three sports—football, basketball and baseball. Coleman graduated from Abilene Christian with a Bachelor of Arts degree in English in 1928, and subsequently earned a master's degree in post-secondary education in 1949. He served in the U.S. Army Air Force during World War II.

Coaching career
Coleman was the sixth head football coach at Abilene Christian University serving for five seasons, from 1942 to 1949 with a three-year interruption during World War II, and compiling a record of 28–15–2.

In 1950, Florida Gators football head coach Bob Woodruff recruited Coleman to be his assistant at the University of Florida in Gainesville, Florida. Georgia Tech Yellow Jackets football head coach Bobby Dodd subsequently invited him to become part of the Georgia Tech coaching staff in Atlanta, Georgia. While coaching at Georgia Tech, he also was the assistant athletic director and the coach of Georgia Tech's freshmen football team.

SEC commissioner
Coleman became the fourth commissioner of the Southeastern Conference (SEC) in 1966, serving until 1972.

Death
Coleman died of a heart attack on October 18, 1973, at his home in Abilene, Texas.

Head coaching record

References

External links
 

1907 births
1973 deaths
Abilene Christian Wildcats baseball players
Abilene Christian Wildcats football coaches
Abilene Christian Wildcats football players
Abilene Christian Wildcats men's basketball players
Florida Gators football coaches
Georgia Tech Yellow Jackets football coaches
Southeastern Conference commissioners
United States Army Air Forces personnel of World War II
People from Franklin County, Alabama
Players of American football from Texas
American men's basketball players
Military personnel from Alabama